Zabed Islam is an Indian politician. He was elected to the Assam Legislative Assembly from Mankachar in the 2011 Assam Legislative Assembly election as an Independent member.

He was nominated from Dhubri as Asom Gana Parishad candidate in 2019 Indian general election.

References

1969 births
Living people
Asom Gana Parishad politicians
Independent politicians in India
People from Dhubri district
Assam MLAs 2011–2016
Candidates in the 2019 Indian general election